Eledone microsicya is a little-known species of octopus from the western Indian Ocean.  There is a view that because of the similarity in the skins of the single specimen of E. microsicya to the Musky Octopus Eledone moschata that this is not a valid taxon and represents a Red Sea population of the otherwise Mediteraranean E. moschata.

References

microsicya
Molluscs described in 1884